Ma Ying (born 18 June 1971) is a former Chinese gymnast who participated in the 1988 Summer Olympics. She won 2 gold medals at the 1986 Asian Games: Team and Vault.

References

1971 births
Olympic gymnasts of China
Gymnasts at the 1988 Summer Olympics
living people
Sportspeople from Changsha
Chinese female artistic gymnasts
Gymnasts at the 1986 Asian Games
Asian Games medalists in gymnastics
Asian Games gold medalists for China
Medalists at the 1986 Asian Games
20th-century Chinese women